Cyclone Tracy was a tropical cyclone that devastated the city of Darwin, Northern Territory, Australia, from 24 to 26 December 1974. The small, developing easterly storm had initially appeared likely to pass clear of the city, but then turned towards it early on 24 December. After 10:00 p.m. ACST, damage became severe, and wind gusts reached  before instruments failed. The anemometer in Darwin Airport control tower had its needle bent in half by the strength of the gusts.

Residents of Darwin were celebrating Christmas, and did not immediately acknowledge the emergency, partly because they had been alerted to an earlier cyclone (Selma) that passed west of the city, and did not affect it in any way. Additionally, news outlets had only a skeleton crew on duty over the holiday.

Tracy killed 71 people, caused A$837 million in damage (1974 dollars), or approximately A$7.2 billion (2022 dollars), or US$5.2 billion (2022 dollars). It destroyed more than 70 percent of Darwin's buildings, including 80 percent of houses. It left more than 25,000 out of the 47,000 inhabitants of the city homeless prior to landfall and required the evacuation of over 30,000 people, of whom many never returned. After the storm passed, the city was rebuilt using more stringent standards "to cyclone code". The storm is the second-smallest tropical cyclone on record (in terms of gale-force wind diameter), behind only Tropical Storm Marco in 2008.

Meteorological history

This disturbance was tracked by the Darwin Weather Bureau's regional director Ray Wilkie, and by senior meteorologist Geoff Crane. On 21 December 1974, the ESSA-8 satellite showed evidence of a newly formed circular centre near latitude 8° south and longitude 135° east. Crane - the meteorological duty officer at the time - issued the initial tropical cyclone alert, describing the storm as a tropical low that could develop into a tropical cyclone.

Later in the evening, the Darwin meteorological office received an infrared satellite image from the National Oceanic and Atmospheric Administration's satellite, NOAA-4, showing that the low pressure had developed further and that spiralling clouds could be observed. Cyclone Tracy was first observed on the Darwin radar on the morning of 22 December.

Over the next few days, the cyclone moved in a southwesterly direction, passing north of Darwin on 22 December. A broadcast on ABC Radio that day stated that Cyclone Tracy posed no immediate threat to Darwin. However, early in the morning of 24 December, Tracy rounded Cape Fourcroy on the western tip of Bathurst Island, and moved in a southeasterly direction, straight towards Darwin.

By late afternoon on 24 December, the sky over the city was heavily overcast, with low clouds, and was experiencing strong rain. Wind gusts increased in strength; between 10p.m. (local time) and midnight, the damage became serious, and residents began to realise that the cyclone would not just pass by the city, but rather over it. On 25 December at around 3:30a.m., Tracy's centre crossed the coast near Fannie Bay. The anemometer (wind speed instrument) failed at around 3:10a.m., with the wind vane (wind direction) destroyed after the cyclone's eye passed over. The Bureau of Meteorology's official estimates suggested that Tracy's gusts had reached . This was recorded during the eye of the cyclone. From around 6:30a.m., the winds began to ease, with the rainfall ceasing at around 8:30 a.m. After making landfall, Tracy rapidly weakened, dissipating on 26 December.

Preparations
Darwin had been severely battered by cyclones before; in January 1897 and again in March 1937. However, in the 20 years leading up to Cyclone Tracy, the city had undergone a period of rapid expansion. E.P. Milliken estimated that on the eve of the cyclone there were 43,500 people living in 12,000 dwellings in the Darwin area. Though building standards at the time required that some attention be given to the possibility of cyclones, most buildings were not capable of withstanding the force of a cyclone's direct hit.

On the day of the cyclone, most residents of Darwin believed that the cyclone would not cause any damage to the city. Cyclone Selma had been predicted to hit Darwin earlier in the month, but it instead went north and dissipated without affecting Darwin in any way. As a result, Cyclone Tracy took most Darwin residents by surprise. Despite several warnings, the people of Darwin did not evacuate or prepare for the cyclone. Many residents continued to prepare for Christmas, and many attended Christmas parties, despite the increasing winds and heavy rain. Journalist Bill Bunbury interviewed the residents of Darwin some time later  and recorded the experiences of the survivors of the cyclone in his book Cyclone Tracy, picking up the pieces. Resident Dawn Lawrie, a 1971 independent candidate for the electorate of Nightcliff, told him:

Another resident, Barbara Langkrens, said:

Impact

Cyclone Tracy killed at least 71 people. The storm also caused the substantial destruction of the city of Darwin. At Darwin Airport, thirty-one aircraft were destroyed and another twenty-five badly damaged. The initial estimate put the reported death toll at 65, but it was revised upwards in March 2005 to 71, when the Northern Territory Coroner proclaimed that those six who still remained listed as missing had "perished at sea".

Several factors delayed the dissemination of the news of the cyclone's impact. The destruction of transportation infrastructure and the distance between Darwin and the rest of the Australian population played a role, as did the fact the storm made landfall on Christmas Day and most media outlets had only a skeleton crew rostered on at best. Most Australians were not aware of the cyclone until late in the afternoon. Dick Muddimer, a reporter for the local ABC radio station, 8DR, credited as being the man who informed the rest of the nation about the cyclone, after finding out that the ABC's studios on Cavenagh Street were completely knocked off transmission, was able to travel through the wreckage and the storm to the studios of the local television station NTD-8 to send a message to the ABC station in Mount Isa, Queensland to notify ABC headquarters in Sydney that Darwin had been hit by a cyclone.

In order to provide the initial emergency response, a committee was created. The committee, composed of several high-level public servants and police, stated that, "Darwin had, for the time being, ceased to exist as a city". Gough Whitlam, the Australian Prime Minister, was touring Syracuse, Sicily, at the time and flew to Darwin upon hearing of the disaster. Additionally, the Australian government began a mass evacuation by road and air; all of the Defence Force personnel throughout Australia, along with the entire Royal Australian Air Force's fleet of transport planes, were recalled from holiday leave and deployed to evacuate civilians from Darwin as well as to bring essential relief supplies to the area. Thirteen RAN ships were used to transport supplies to the area as part of Operation Navy Help Darwin, which is the largest humanitarian or disaster relief operation ever performed by the Royal Australian Navy.

Health and essential services crisis
As soon as the worst of the storm had passed, Darwin faced several immediate health crises. On Christmas Day, the Darwin Hospital treated well over five hundred patients, with 112 of these being admitted into the hospital, and both of the facility's operating theatres being utilised. The first casualties did not arrive till 7a.m. because of high winds and severe road conditions in and around the Darwin area. Operating continued throughout the night and into the early morning. Local teams worked without relief until the arrival of a surgical team from Canberra late that day. Those who were considered unable to return to work within two weeks were evacuated by air to safer locations.

All official communications out of Darwin were no longer operational. The antennas at the OTC Coastal Radio Service station (callsign VID) were destroyed during the storm. Station manager Bob Hooper, who was an amateur radio operator, helped to establish communications using his own equipment. By 10a.m. Gary Gibson, another amateur operator, was able to establish a station at the Darwin Community College, and within a short period of time, a network of stations was established across the country. This network, coordinated by Melbourne D24 police, provided message services to the cities of Perth, Melbourne, Sydney, Canberra, Townsville, Brisbane, Adelaide, Alice Springs, Gove, Mt Isa, Cairns, Rockhampton, MacKay, Lismore, and Cooma. By 10:40 a.m. VID operators had established VID2 on board MV Nyanda in Darwin Harbour, and then for five days official communications traffic in and out of Darwin was handled via continuous wave radio (Morse code). The only local radio station that wasn't completely disabled was the ABC's 8DR. For the next two days, it was Darwin's only link to the outside world and was on the air for all but 34 hours in the coming weeks.

Those who remained in Darwin faced the threat of several diseases due to much of the city being without water, electricity, or basic sanitation. An initial response was to vaccinate residents for typhoid and cholera. Approximately 30,000 people were homeless and were forced to seek shelter in several makeshift housing and emergency centres that lacked proper hygienic conditions. Volunteers came in from across the country to assist with the emergency relief efforts. Trench latrines were dug, water supplies delivered by tankers, and mass immunisation programs begun. The army was given the task of searching houses for bodies of people and animals, as well as locating other health risks, for example, cleaning out rotting contents from fridges and freezers across the city. This was completed within a week. Houses which had been "searched and cleared" had S&C painted on an external wall. The city itself was sprayed with malathion to control mosquitoes and other similar pests.

Attempts to reconnect the essential services to the city began on Christmas Day. Local officers from the Commonwealth Department of Housing and Construction began clearing debris and working to restore power. They sealed off damaged water hydrants and activated pumps to reactivate the city's water and sewerage systems.

Evacuation and the public response
Major-General Alan Stretton, Director-General of the Natural Disasters Organisation, and the Commonwealth Minister for the Northern Territory, Rex Patterson, arrived at Darwin Airport late on Christmas Day and took charge of the relief efforts. After an assessment of the situation and meetings with the Department of the Northern Territory and the relevant minister, it was concluded that Darwin's population needed to be reduced to a "safe level" of 10,500 people. This decision was made on the advice of Dr. Charles Gurd, the Director of Health in the Northern Territory. Around 10,000 people left Darwin and the surrounding area within the first two days, but the rate of departures then began to slow down. The government then gave support to his position, offering full reimbursement of personal costs, as long as the evacuation took place.

The population was evacuated by air and ground; because of communications difficulties with Darwin airport, landing was limited to one plane every ninety minutes. At major airports, teams of federal and territory department officials as well as Salvation Army and Red Cross workers met refugees, with the Red Cross taking responsibility for keeping track of the names and temporary addresses of the refugees. Evacuations were prioritised according to need; women, children, the elderly, and the sick were evacuated first. There were reports of men dressing up as women to escape with the early evacuations. Between 26 and 31 December, a total of 35,362 people were evacuated from Darwin. Of those, 25,628 were evacuated by air, the remainder by road. By 31 December, only 10,638 people (mostly men who were required to help clean up the city) remained in Darwin. Stretton also regulated access to the city by means of a permit system. Permits were issued only to those who were involved in either the relief or reconstruction efforts, and were used to prevent the early return of those who had been evacuated.

Upon receiving news of the damage, several community groups across Australia began fundraising and relief efforts to assist the survivors. Major reception centres were set up in cities such as Katherine, Tennant Creek and Alice Springs. Several of the small towns along the Stuart Highway made efforts to assist people who were fleeing by road, supplying them with food, fuel, rest, and mechanical aid. At Adelaide River, the small local population provided hot meals to the refugees who stopped there. Approximately twenty-four hours after the storm hit Darwin, the population of Alice Springs had raised over $105,000 to assist the victims of Tracy. In Melbourne at the Boxing Day Test cricket match between Australia and England, members of both teams moved around the boundaries carrying buckets which the crowd threw cash into for the relief funds. Darwin families were also given priority on public housing waiting lists. On 31 December 1974, Stretton recommended that full civilian control should resume in Darwin, and handed over control of the city to its elected officials.

Aftermath

Reconstruction and effects on Darwin

In February 1975, Whitlam announced the creation of the Darwin Reconstruction Commission, which was given the task of rebuilding the city "within five years", focusing primarily on building houses. The Commission was headed by Tony Powell. The damage to the city was so severe that some advocated moving the entire city. However, the government insisted that it be rebuilt in the same location. By May 1975, Darwin's population had recovered somewhat, with 30,000 residing in the city. Temporary housing, caravans, hotels, and an ocean liner (MV Patris), were used to house people, because reconstruction of permanent housing had not yet begun by September that year. Ella Stack became Mayor of Darwin in May 1975 and was heavily involved in its reconstruction.

However, by the following April, and after receiving criticism for the slow speed of reconstruction, the Commission had built 3,000 new homes in the nearly destroyed northern suburbs, and completed repairs to those that had survived the storm. Several new building codes were drawn up, trying to achieve the competing goals of the speedy recovery of the area and ensuring that there would be no repeat of the damage that Darwin took in 1974. By 1978, much of the city had recovered and was able to house almost the same number of people as it had before the cyclone hit. However, by the 1980s, as many as sixty percent of Darwin's 1974 population had left, never to return. In the years that followed, Darwin was almost entirely rebuilt and now shows almost no resemblance to the pre-Tracy Darwin of December 1974.

Although a Legislative Assembly had been set up earlier in the year, the Northern Territory had only minimal self-government, with a federal minister being responsible for the Territory from Canberra. However, the cyclone and subsequent responses highlighted several problems with the way the regional government was set up. This led Malcolm Fraser, Whitlam's successor as Prime Minister, to give self-government to the Territory in 1978.

Many of the government records associated with Cyclone Tracy became publicly available on 1 January 2005 under the 30-year rule.

In popular culture
Cyclone Tracy inspired the song "Santa Never Made It into Darwin", composed by Bill Cate and performed by Bill and Boyd in 1975 to raise money for the relief and reconstruction efforts. In 1983, Hoodoo Gurus released "Tojo", a song comparing the Japanese bombing of Darwin under the command of Hideki Tojo during World War II to the damage done by Cyclone Tracy. The much-feared Japanese invasion never happened, but the cyclone was virtually ignored and ended up destroying the city. In May 1976, Australian band Ayers Rock released the single "Song for Darwin", also as a fundraiser for the relief and reconstruction efforts.

In 1986, the Nine Network and PBL created Cyclone Tracy, a period drama mini-series based on the events during the cyclone. Michael Fisher, Ted Roberts and Leon Saunders wrote the series, and it starred Chris Haywood and Tracy Mann, who played the lead characters of Steve and Connie. The mini-series was released on DVD by Umbrella Entertainment in December 2005. The DVD is compatible with all region codes and includes special features such as newsreel footage of the devastation and a documentary titled On A Wind and a Prayer.

Records and meteorological statistics
Tracy is the most compact cyclone or equivalent-strength hurricane on record in the Australian basin and Southern Hemisphere, with gale-force winds extending only  from the centre, and was also the smallest tropical cyclone worldwide until 2008, when Tropical Storm Marco of the 2008 Atlantic hurricane season broke the record, with gale-force winds extending only  from the centre. After forming over the Arafura Sea, the storm moved southwards and affected the city with Category 4 winds on the Australian cyclone intensity scale, while there is evidence to suggest that it had reached Category 3 on the Saffir-Simpson Hurricane Scale when it made landfall. Bruce Stannard of The Age stated that Cyclone Tracy was a "disaster of the first magnitude ... without parallel in Australia's history."

Pressure estimates 
David Longshore, in the book Encyclopedia of Hurricanes, Typhoons, and Cyclones 1992 and 2008 edition, states that Tracy's barometric pressure was as low as 914 mbar, but the actual lowest pressure was 950 mbar. This information was recorded by a Bureau of Meteorology staff member at the Darwin airport.

See also

 1897 Darwin cyclone
 Santa Never Made It into Darwin
 Cyclone Tracy (1986 mini-series)
 Blown Away (2014 film), documentary film about Cyclone Tracy
 Booya (ship)
 Cyclone Althea, Christmas 1971, Queensland
 Cyclone Marcus, March 2018, Kimberley, WA
 List of tropical cyclones
 Typhoon Nock-ten, Christmas 2016, Philippines, strongest Christmas Day tropical cyclone on record
 Typhoon Tip, 1979, Philippines, the largest tropical cyclone on record

References

Bibliography

External links

Memories and comments of Cyclone Tracy
Cyclone Tracy, Northern Territory Library online feature
Northern Territory Library online exhibition Cyclone Tracy
Northern Territory Library on Cyclone Tracy
Collected oral histories of Cyclone Tracy
Houses destroyed by Cyclone Tracy, Darwin, December 1974 (picture) / Alan Dwyer.
Meteorological Information
Weather satellite image of Tropical Cyclone Tracy 25 December 1974 (9:55am Darwin time, 0025 Greenwich Mean Time), over Darwin, Northern Territory, from NOAA 4.
Records about Cyclone Tracy from the Australian Bureau of Meteorology
Additional Information on Cyclone Tracy
Australia Broadcasting Corp. Rewind on Cyclone Tracy
House construction details before C-Tracy. Darwin builder's website.
The National Film and Sound Archive of Australia added ABC coverage of the aftermath of the cyclone, broadcast on ABC radio and radio outlets around the world, featuring Mike Hayes, a senior ABC journalist in Darwin, to their Sounds of Australia registry in 2011.
Listen to Mike Hayes' first-person account of the aftermath of the cyclone on australianscreen online
See the National Film and Sound Archive of Australia's film Cyclone Tracy – Darwin, Christmas 1974 from its Film Australia Collection.

 
1974–75 Australian region cyclone season
1974 in Australia
1974 natural disasters
Tropical cyclones in the Northern Territory
History of Darwin, Northern Territory
Retired Australian region cyclones
Category 4 Australian region cyclones
Disasters in the Northern Territory
1974 disasters in Australia